Upper Gamble's is a village in Saint John Parish, Antigua and Barbuda.

Demographics 
Upper Gamble's has one enumeration district, ED 16500.

Census Data (2011)

References 

Saint John Parish, Antigua and Barbuda
Populated places in Antigua and Barbuda